Jonathan Steve Heris (born 3 September 1990) is a Belgian professional footballer who plays as a centre back for RWDM.

Professional career
In the 2008–09 season, Heris was promoted from the youth academy of FC Brussels to the first team. Over time, he grew into a starter there. After shorter stints at RWS Bruxelles and Tubize, both competing at the second highest level in Belgium, he moved abroad in January 2014. Heris signed a contract with the Hungarian first division team Újpest, partly due to the Belgian chairman of the club, Roland Duchâtelet. At Újpest, Heris became an undisputed starter in defense. In his first season, the club won the Hungarian Cup. After three-and-a-half seasons, he moved to rivals Puskás Akadémia. After two seasons there, Heris returned to Újpest.

On 14 July 2020, it was announced that Eupen had signed Heris on a two-year contract. On 10 August, he made his debut in the starting line-up against Oud-Heverlee Leuven.

In the summer of 2022, Heris returned to RWDM on a two-year contract.

Club statistics
Updated to games played as of 27 June 2020.

Honours
Újpest
Hungarian Cup: 2013–14

References

External links
 MLSZ 
 HLSZ 
 

1990 births
Living people
Footballers from Brussels
Belgian footballers
Association football midfielders
R.W.D.M. Brussels F.C. players
RWS Bruxelles players
A.F.C. Tubize players
Újpest FC players
Puskás Akadémia FC players
K.A.S. Eupen players
RWDM47 players
Challenger Pro League players
Nemzeti Bajnokság I players
Belgian Pro League players
Belgian expatriate footballers
Expatriate footballers in Hungary
Belgian expatriate sportspeople in Hungary